SMS Emden ("His Majesty's Ship Emden") was a German light cruiser belonging to the , built during the First World War. Emden served in the German Imperial Navy until the end of the war, at which point she was ceded to France. The ship was named after the previous , which had been destroyed at the Battle of Cocos earlier in the war. She mounted an Iron Cross on her stem-head in honor of the earlier Emden. The new cruiser was laid down in 1914 at the AG Weser shipyard in Bremen, launched in February 1916, and commissioned into the High Seas Fleet in December 1916.

After her commissioning, she was assigned to serve as a flotilla leader for torpedo boats. She participated in only one major action, Operation Albion, in October 1917. There, she shelled Russian gun batteries and troop positions and engaged Russian destroyers and gunboats. The ship also led a successful, albeit minor, operation against British shipping in the North Sea in December 1917. After the end of the war, she was interned with the rest of the German fleet in Scapa Flow. On 21 June 1919, the interned fleet scuttled itself, though Emden was run aground by British ships before she could sink completely. Ceded to France in the Treaty of Versailles, she was too badly damaged by the attempted scuttling and beaching to see service with the French Navy, so was instead used as a target after 1922, and broken up for scrap in 1926.

Design

Her propulsion system consisted of two sets of steam turbines powered by ten coal-fired and two oil-fired Marine-type water-tube boilers. The ship had a crew of 17 officers and 458 enlisted men.

The ship was armed with a main battery of eight  SK L/45 guns in single pedestal mounts. Two were placed side by side forward on the forecastle, four were located amidships, two on either side, and two were arranged in a superfiring pair aft. They were supplied with 1,040 rounds of ammunition, for 130 shells per gun. Königsberg also carried two  SK L/45 anti-aircraft guns mounted on the centerline astern of the funnels. She was also equipped with a pair of  torpedo tubes with eight torpedoes in deck-mounted swivel launchers amidships. She also carried 200 mines.

Service history
Emden was ordered under the contract name "Ersatz " and was laid down at the AG Weser shipyard in Bremen in 1914. She was launched on 1 February 1916, after which fitting-out work commenced. She was commissioned into the High Seas Fleet on 16 December 1916. In October 1917, Emden was serving as the flagship of Commodore Paul Heinrich, the commander of torpedo-boats assigned to Operation Albion. For the initial assault on 12 October, Emden was tasked with bombarding a Russian gun emplacement at Pamerort; Heinrich was given command of the landings there. At 06:08, Emden opened fire on the gun battery. Her first two salvos fell short, but the third hit and disabled the telephone wires and speaking tubes, which rendered central control of the Russian guns impossible. By 07:00, the Russian guns were silenced and German troops began to go ashore unopposed. Two and a half hours later, a pair of Russian destroyers attempted to intervene, but Emden engaged them and drove them off.

The next morning, a group of eight Russian destroyers made an attack on the German fleet. Emdens salvos straddled the destroyers several times, raining shell splinters down on the Russians. They suffered no casualties, but the wireless equipment for the destroyer  was disabled. At 09:30, another pair of destroyers briefly engaged Emden. The weather had by then become poor, but the Germans had erected a signal station at Pamerort to assist Emden in directing her fire. At around 12:20, the Russian gunboat  arrived with a pair of destroyers; she was intended to use her long-range guns to drive off Emden. She arrived at 13:00 and briefly engaged Emden. Neither ship was hit, though Emden straddled the gunboat several times before Chivinetz retreated.

On 14 October, Emden participated in an operation to clear the Kassar Wiek—the body of water between the islands of Dagö and Ösel—of Russian naval forces. She and the battleship  were to steam to the entrance to Soelo Sound, where they could support the force of torpedo-boats tasked with sweeping the Kassar Wiek. Four Russian destroyers approached Emden, but kept out of range of her guns. Kaiser, however, was in range, and at approximately 11:50, she opened fire. She quickly scored a hit on the destroyer Grom. The round failed to explode and passed through Grom, causing the ship to begin sinking. The other destroyers subsequently steamed off at high speed. Emden remained in her position outside Soelo Sound after the sweep was completed, through the next day. The following day, Emden initiated the bombardment of Dagö, starting at 15:00. On the morning of the 18th, Emden bombarded Russian positions on Dagö again; she fired 170 shells and forced the Russians to retreat. By 20 October, the islands were under German control and the Russian naval forces had either been destroyed or forced to withdraw. The Admiralstab ordered the naval component to return to the North Sea.

In December 1917, Emden led a raid on British shipping in the North Sea. Early on the 11th, Emden and the II Flotilla left port; the torpedo-boat flotilla split in half off the Dogger Bank to search for the British convoy, while Emden stood by in support at the Dogger Bank. The torpedo boats sank four of six steamers located and did not encounter any British warships. The torpedo-boats rejoined Emden late on the 12th and returned to port.

Fate
After the Armistice with Germany in November 1918 most of the High Seas Fleet's ships, under the command of Rear Admiral Ludwig von Reuter, were interned at the British naval base at Scapa Flow. Emden was among them. While at Scapa Flow, the crew of the battleship  harassed Reuter incessantly, until the British allowed him to transfer his flag to Emden, where he remained for the remainder of the internment.

The fleet remained interned during the negotiations that ultimately produced the Versailles Treaty. Reuter believed the British intended to seize his fleet on 21 June 1919, which was the deadline for Germany to sign the peace treaty. Unaware that the deadline had been extended to the 23rd, Reuter ordered the ships to be scuttled at the next opportunity. On the morning of 21 June the British fleet left Scapa Flow to conduct training maneuvers, and at 11:20 Reuter transmitted the order to his ships. Emden, however, did not sink; British ships towed her close to shore where she was beached and later re-floated. Too badly damaged by flooding and beaching for further service, Emden was awarded to the French Navy on 11 March 1920, as a so-called "Propaganda ship" which could be used as a target or for experimental purposes for a short time before being scrapped or sunk. She was used as an explosives testing target and ultimately broken up for scrap in Caen in 1926.

Notes

Footnotes

Citations

References

Further reading
 
 

Königsberg-class cruisers (1915)
Ships built in Bremen (state)
1916 ships
World War I cruisers of Germany
Ships sunk as targets
World War I warships scuttled at Scapa Flow
Maritime incidents in 1919